Erkhembayaryn Davaachimeg is a Mongolian freestyle wrestler. She won one of the bronze medals in the women's 57 kg event at the 2021 World Wrestling Championships in Oslo, Norway. She competed in the women's 57kg event at the 2022 World Wrestling Championships held in Belgrade, Serbia.

References

External links 

 

Living people
Mongolian female sport wrestlers
World Wrestling Championships medalists
1993 births
21st-century Mongolian women